Viktor Aristov may refer to:

 Viktor Aristov (football manager) (born 1938), Soviet football manager
 Viktor Aristov (director) (1948–1994), Soviet film director